Evan Smith (born  April 20, 1966) is an American journalist. He is the former CEO of The Texas Tribune and host of the weekly interview program Overheard with Evan Smith.

Early life and education 
Born in New York, Smith has a bachelor's degree in public policy from Hamilton College and a master's degree in journalism from the Medill School of Journalism at Northwestern University (which inducted him into its Hall of Achievement in April 2006).

Career 
Since September 2010, he has hosted Overheard with Evan Smith, a weekly interview program produced by KLRU that airs on PBS stations nationally.

Texas Monthly 
Smith joined the staff of Texas Monthly as a senior editor in January 1992. In February 1993, he was promoted to deputy editor, and in July 2000, he was made editor. In May 2002, he added the title of executive vice president. He announced his intention to resign on July 17, 2009, and stepped down on August 21, 2009.

Texas Tribune 
Smith co-founded the Texas Tribune, an online, nonprofit, non-partisan public media organization, with Austin venture capitalist John Thornton and veteran journalist Ross Ramsey. It launched on November 3, 2009. In January 2022, Smith announced his intentions to step down from his role as CEO by the year's end.

References

External links 

Evan Smith, Texas Tribune

American magazine editors
American male journalists
Writers from Austin, Texas
Hamilton College (New York) alumni
Medill School of Journalism alumni
1966 births
Living people
Journalists from New York City